Pokémon: Diamond and Pearl is the tenth season of the Pokémon anime series, and the first and titular season of Pokémon the Series: Diamond and Pearl, known in Japan as . It originally aired in Japan from September 28, 2006, to October 25, 2007, on TV Tokyo, and in the United States from April 20, 2007, to February 1, 2008, on Cartoon Network. Covering the continuing adventures of series protagonist Ash Ketchum and Pikachu, and his best friend Brock, the two meet a new coordinator named Dawn, who travels with them through Sinnoh and enters Pokemon Contests.



Episode list

Music 

The first 3 episodes in Japan did not have the opening song, instead the instrumental songs from the Pokémon: Diamond and Pearl Japanese Anime Sound Collection serve as opening songs for 3 episodes during the original broadcast, and for 1 episode on DVD. The Japanese opening song is "Together" by Fumie Akiyoshi for 47 episodes during the original broadcast, and for 45 episodes on DVD. The ending songs are "By Your Side 〜Hikari's Theme〜" (君のそばで 〜ヒカリのテーマ〜,Kimi no Soba de 〜Hikari no Tēma〜) for 21 episodes during the original broadcast, and for 23 episodes on DVD, "By Your Side 〜Hikari's Theme〜 (PopUp. Version)" (君のそばで〜ヒカリのテーマ〜 PopUp. Version, Kimi no Soba de 〜Hikari no Tēma〜 PopUp. Version) for 27 episodes, "By Your Side 〜Hikari's Theme〜 (Winter. Version)" (君のそばで 〜ヒカリのテーマ〜 Winter. Version, Kimi no Soba de 〜Hikari no Tēma〜 Winter Version) for 1 episode by Grin, and the English opening song is "Diamond and Pearl" by "Breeze" Barczynski. Its instrumental version did serve as the end credit song.

Home media releases
In the United States, the series was released on six volume DVDs (each containing 8-9 episodes per disc) by Viz Media in North America, released both individually and in a boxset.

Viz Media and Warner Home Video released Pokémon the Series: Diamond and Pearl – The Complete Season on DVD on August 20, 2019.

Notes

References

External links 
 
  at TV Tokyo 
  at TV Tokyo 
  at Pokémon JP official website 

2006 Japanese television seasons
2007 Japanese television seasons
Season10